Let It Ride is the third studio album by the British rock band Shed Seven, released in June 1998 via Polydor Records, and was the band's first LP to be written solely by Rick Witter (lyrics) and Paul Banks (music).

The album features Clint Boon of the Oldham-based band, Inspiral Carpets, on keyboards, and Heather "Lady Galadril" Findlay, of the fellow York-based band, Mostly Autumn, on vocals.

Reception

Let It Ride garnered a mixed reception upon release. At the time the Shed's were deemed to be taking on a 'new', punchier sound following first hearings of their comeback single, "She Left Me on Friday", with various reviewers drawing comparisons to both Black Grape and Blur. The NME, who labelled the song "the most fiendishly clever Blur parody ever", went on to liken the album's sound to that of both The Rolling Stones and The Stone Roses in their lukewarm review;

Writing for The Guardian in June 1998, Caroline Sullivan saw Let It Ride as an improvement on the band's previous album, stating that "it aspires to bigger things, and almost gets there [whilst] singer Rick Witter has even acquired a raspiness that complements the beefy music".

Chart performance

Album
Let It Ride spent a total of 7 weeks in the UK album chart, peaking at number 9 on 13 June 1998, giving the band their second consecutive Top 10 album release.

Singles
It spawned four UK hit singles for the band with "Chasing Rainbows", "She Left Me on Friday", "The Heroes" and "Devil in Your Shoes (Walking All Over)" all placing in the Top 40 of the Singles Chart. "She Left Me on Friday" was the most successful of the four, peaking at number 11 on 14 March 1998.

Track listing
All tracks written by Witter/Paul Banks.

UK version

Track 10 is an alternate mix to the single version originally released in 1996, reworked by Stephen Street.

Japanese version
The Japanese album release, along with a different album cover, featured a different running order with 2 additional bonus tracks, "Slinky Love Theme" and "Happy Now", which were to be found as b-sides on the UK single releases of "The Heroes" and "Devil in Your Shoes (Walking All Over)", respectively.

2014 Remaster released 4 August 2014

Personnel

Shed Seven
Rick Witter – lead vocals
Paul Banks – guitars, keyboards, harmonica
Tom Gladwin – bass
Alan Leach – drums, percussion

Additional musicians
Clint Boon – keyboards
Heather Findlay – backing vocals
The Kick Horns – brass

References

External links

Let It Ride at YouTube (streamed copy where licensed)

Shed Seven albums
1998 albums
Albums produced by Stephen Street
Polydor Records albums